Clyde Simmons Jr. (born August 4, 1964) is a former American football defensive end and current college defensive line coach.

Playing career

College
Simmons played college football at Western Carolina University helping lead the Catamounts to the 1983 NCAA Division I-AA National Championship game. In 1992 he was inducted into the Western Carolina Athletics Hall of Fame.

NFL
Simmons was taken in the 9th round of the 1986 NFL Draft by the Philadelphia Eagles where he spent 8 seasons (1986-1993). After leaving Philadelphia he went on to play for the Arizona Cardinals (1994–1995), Jacksonville Jaguars (1996–1997), Cincinnati Bengals (1998), and the Chicago Bears (1999–2000). He led the NFL with 19 sacks in 1992 and finished his career 11th all time on the NFL sack list, with 121.5. He was selected to the Pro Bowl in 1991 and 1992. Simmons also returned an interception for a touchdown against Jim Kelly and the Buffalo Bills in the 1996 NFL Playoffs.

Post-playing career
Simmons began his coaching career in 2008 at Greater Atlanta Christian School as the defensive line coach.

In 2010, he accepted an offer from Rex Ryan as a fellowship coach with the New York Jets.

Simmons was an assistant defensive line coach for the St. Louis/Los Angeles Rams. The Rams had 217 total sacks during Simmons' tenure. With the Rams, Simmons coached three-time Pro Bowl defensive tackle and the 2014 NFL Defensive Rookie of the Year Aaron Donald, and defensive end Robert Quinn, who set a single-season franchise record with 19 sacks in 2013. In January 2017, he was hired by the Cleveland Browns to coach their defensive line.

In 2019 he was hired as a defensive line coach at Missouri Baptist university.

In May 2021 he was hired by new Tennessee State head football coach Eddie George as the Tigers' defensive line coach.

References

External links
 Tennessee State profile

1964 births
Living people
American football defensive ends
Arizona Cardinals players
Cleveland Browns coaches
Chicago Bears players
Cincinnati Bengals players
Jacksonville Jaguars players
Philadelphia Eagles players
Tennessee State Tigers football coaches
Western Carolina Catamounts football players
National Conference Pro Bowl players
People from Williamsburg County, South Carolina
Sportspeople from Wilmington, North Carolina
Coaches of American football from North Carolina
Players of American football from North Carolina
African-American coaches of American football
African-American players of American football
21st-century African-American people
20th-century African-American sportspeople
100 Sacks Club
Ed Block Courage Award recipients
Brian Piccolo Award winners